Francis Cosne (17 May 1916 – 13 December 1984) was a French film producer and screenwriter. He produced more than 30 films between 1948 and 1979. In 1972, he was a member of the jury at the 22nd Berlin International Film Festival.

Selected filmography
 Les Parents terribles (1948)
 The Cupid Club (1949)
 The Cape of Hope (1951)
 Fanfan la Tulipe (1952)
 Lucrèce Borgia (1953)
 Madame du Barry (1954)
 Women's Club (1956)
 Angélique, Marquise des Anges (1964)
 Marvelous Angelique (1965)
 Angelique and the King (1966)
 Untamable Angelique (1967)
Angelique and the Sultan (1968)
 The Private Lesson (1968)
 Une femme fidèle (1976)

References

External links

1916 births
1984 deaths
French film producers
French male screenwriters
20th-century French screenwriters
20th-century French male writers